"The Road to Cincinnati" is the eighth episode of the thirty-second season of the American animated television series The Simpsons, and the 692nd episode overall. It aired in the United States on Fox on November 29, 2020. The episode was directed by Matthew Nastuk, and written by Jeff Westbrook.

Hannibal Buress guest-stars  as Principal Finch and Jason Bateman appeared as himself.

The episode featured Superintendent Chalmers and Principal Skinner going to Cincinnati. It received mixed reviews and was watched live in the United States by 1.63 million viewers.

Plot
When Superintendent Chalmers is selected to give the keynote speech at an administrators' convention in Cincinnati, he elects to take popular Principal Finch as his plus one. During detention, Bart notes the school's lack of respect for Principal Skinner and urges him to step up his game to win the spot. When Finch falls ill from food poisoning, Skinner volunteers in his place, and Chalmers reluctantly agrees.

Things get off to a rocky start when Skinner checks the bag with Chalmers's anxiety medicine at the airport, causing him to have a panic attack and get thrown off the flight. Skinner volunteers to drive the 800 miles to the convention. The pair face a number of obstacles, including a hitchhiking Shakespearean improv, a traffic court and an angry gang of cyclists; but eventually begin to bond. One night at a bed and breakfast, Skinner overhears a phone conversation between Chalmers and Finch, revealing that Chalmers was planning on replacing Skinner with Finch as principal. Furious, Skinner confronts his boss, admitting he had deliberately poisoned Finch to keep him off the trip. The two brawl, and Chalmers heads to Cincinnati alone.

At the keynote speech, Chalmers realizes he had left his notes with Skinner, and starts to choke. However, he is able to bond with the other superintendents over tales of inept underlings, and ends up praising Skinner, who has just arrived to deliver the notes. The two reconcile and Chalmers delivers his speech. Upon returning to Springfield, Skinner earns the respect of the schoolchildren and meets with Chalmers for a friendly meal at a chili restaurant.

In the tag scene, Marge surprises the family with tickets to the improv group, much to their dismay.

Production

Casting
Hannibal Buress guest-stars in the episode as Principal Finch and Jason Bateman appeared as himself.

Release
On 2020, Fox released eight promotional pictures from the episode. The episode was originally scheduled to air on November 8, 2020, however, due to being preempted by "The 7 Beer Itch", which was preempted by "Treehouse of Horror XXXI", which was preempted by game seven of the 2020 National League Championship Series, the episode was rescheduled to air on November 29, 2020.

Pop culture reference

The song that plays in an endless loop in Skinner's car is "Timothy", a 1970 song about starving miners who kill and eat a man after a cave in.

Reception

Viewing figures 
In the United States, the episode was watched live by 1.63 million viewers.

Critical response 
Tony Sokol with Den of Geek said, "As god as my witness, I thought turkeys could fly, and believe one of the good things about choosing Cincinnati as the setting is the excuse to hear the two WKRP in Cincinnati theme songs. Sadly, that’s a highlight of a fairly lame trip. This is what remote learning does to The Simpsons. “The Road to Cincinnati” is paved with too many good intentions. The Springfield faculty gets to get out of town but ultimately there's nowhere to go but Cincinnati." He also gave the episode three out of five stars.

Jesse Bereta of Bubbleblabber gave the episode gave the episode score of 9/10 stating, "The most exciting thing to come out of this episode was that it allowed the supporting characters the full run-time to tell their story. We have become accustomed to two-plot episodes that feature characters like these having their adventure whilst something else is occurring in the Simpsons home. Not surprisingly, this was preferable."

References

2020 American television episodes
The Simpsons (season 32) episodes
Cincinnati in fiction